Violent Pacification is an EP by the American crossover thrash band D.R.I., which was released in 1984. The title track on this EP was covered by thrash metal band Slayer on their 1996 album "Undisputed Attitude".

Track listing
Dirty Rotten EP

Personnel
Spike Cassidy: Guitar/Backing vocals
Josh Pappe: Bass
Eric Brecht: Drums/Backing vocals
Kurt Brecht: Lead vocals

References

D.R.I. (band) albums
1984 EPs